George Claiborne Watkins (November 25, 1815 – December 7, 1872) was an Arkansas attorney who served as Arkansas Attorney General from 1848 to 1851, and as Chief Justice of the Arkansas Supreme Court from 1853 to 1854.

Born in Shelbyville, Kentucky and raised in Little Rock, Arkansas, Watkins studied law at Litchfield Law School in Connecticut, and at Yale University. Between 1837 and 1844, Watkins was in a law partnership with Chester Ashley, which ended when Ashley was elected to the United States Senate. Watkins was then in a law partnership with James Curran from 1844 until Curran's death in 1854.  Watkins was Arkansas Attorney General from 1848 to 1851; "however, his primary focus continued to be his private practice". He was also a founder of the town of Des Arc, Arkansas on the Arkansas Grand Prairie. Watkins was succeeded as Attorney General of Arkansas by his brother-in-law, J. J. Clendenin.

The Arkansas General Assembly elected Watkins chief justice of the Arkansas Supreme Court, a position previously held by Thomas Johnson, his wife's older sister's husband. Watkins held the Chief Justice role from 1853 to 1854, during which time he did not practice law. Curran's death led Watkins to resign from his position, to take care of his law practice. Watkins, a widower, married Curran's widow.

In 1865, Watkins formed a partnership with U. M. Rose, which became the Rose Law Firm.

References

1815 births
1872 deaths
People from Shelbyville, Kentucky
Litchfield Law School alumni
Yale University alumni
Arkansas Attorneys General
Chief Justices of the Arkansas Supreme Court